SNQ or snq may refer to:

 SNQ, the IATA code for San Quintín Military Airstrip, Baja California, Mexico
 SNQ, the Telegraph code for Shaoguan railway station, Guangdong, China
 snq, the ISO 639-3 code for Sangu language, Gabon